St. Joseph's College is a Roman Catholic school for boys in Sri Lanka. It was founded in 1896 by French Missionaries led by Rev. Father Christopher-Ernest Bonjean O.M.I. The college has over 4,000 enrolled students with a staff of over 450. Former students include the first President of the Maldives, Mohamed Amin Didi, the third President of Sri Lanka, Ranasinghe Premadasa, Nirj Deva Member of the British Parliament and Cardinal Thomas Cooray, the first Cardinal from Sri Lanka.The (Latin) motto of the college is In Scientia et Virtute, meaning "In Knowledge and Virtue".

The school is a non-fee-levying school, receiving some state funding but relying mostly on funds from an extensive network of alumni worldwide.

School buildings cover  and include a sports complex, and an Olympic-standard swimming pool which was built in 1952.

History 

On 2 March 2021 St. Joseph's College celebrated 125 years. Tracing the College's origins and proud achievements, there isn't a better time to track 117 years of evolution, stemming from a seed sown by the then Archbishop of Colombo Rt. Rev. Dr. Christopher Bonjean in 1892 the idea of a Catholic College. Unfortunately the Most Rev. Fr. Bonjean did not live through to see his vision come alive. But the good York was carried out by Rev. Fr. Charles Collin and Rev. Fr. Charles Lyntten, both who went on to be Rectors of the College.

With the foundation stone laid in December 1894, by the Papal Delegate for Asia, Rev. Msgr. St. Joseph's College, Colombo, was declared open on the 2nd of March 1896. From a humble beginning of an initial 211 students in the school proper and 96 students in the preparatory school, Rev. Fr. Charles Collin, was appointed the First Rector. The College building was formally declared open by Governor of Ceylon West Ridgeway and was blessed by Most Rev. Msgr. Zaleski, and the Archbishop Rt. Rev. Dr. Melizan OMI.

The Rector's office, the College office and the classrooms were all housed in the first building - the Clock Tower Building of the College, housing the classrooms, the Rector's office and the College offices. The College magazine was started in 1905. The Bonjean Hall was the third building to be completed, by Rev. Fr. Charles Lytten, the second Rector.

Rector, Rev. Fr. Emil Nicholas OMI was the third Rector appointed in 1912. One of Rev. Fr. Emil Nicholas' greatest achievements was the creation of the first Religious Association of the College, the Guild of the Immaculate Heart of Mary.

Four years later, in 1919, another educationist, scientist and administrator, Rev. Fr. Maurice J. Legoc OMI was appointed the fourth Rector. Continuing the expansion to meet the growing demand for education, in 1933, the present Primary Building, originally named "The Maurice Block", became the newest addition. The next large expansion was the South Wing, a two-storied building to house classrooms.

Being a scientist, Rev. Fr. Legoc in the 1930's could foresee the significance of science in education and its role in a changing world. He took leadership in placing great emphasis on incorporating science subjects into the curriculum. As a botanist, he published Tropical Botany, a text that was widely known in Ordinary Level classes, both in India and Sri Lanka. Fr. Legoc was also responsible and introduced a scheme of scholarships for the under privileged students, making a difference to the lives of the needy and that of the future generations. Fr. Legoc's vision was to widen the provision of education, continuing to make a difference to the lives of those we had to reach. The initiative saw the birth of,

(a) St. Joseph's College South, later St. Peter's College Colombo in 1922

(b) St. Joseph's College Negombo Branch

(c) St. Joseph's College Wattala Branch

(d) St. Paul's College, Waragoda (1935)

(e) St. John's College, Dematagoda (1939)

On the feast of St. Joseph, 19th March 1929, the foundation stone for the College Chapel was laid by the Archbishop of Colombo, yet, another unrivalled architectural marvel, a building with splendour, no columns and acoustic brilliance, one of its kind, the very few in the world, even in today's day and age.

Rev. Fr. Peter Pillai OMI was the fifth Rector, from 1940 to 1961, the first Sri Lankan, a great scholar widely respected in Asia. The Grotto at St. Joseph's, a replica of the Grotto in Lourdes, France, was built in 1940. The College buildings were taken over by the Army during World War II, but the institution continued education with branches housed in Homagama, Kelaniya, Gampaha and later at Borella.

Sports
Cricket has been played at the school since its founding. At that time it was the only Catholic school in a group of elite, mainly secular or Protestant Christian, private boys' schools which often played against one another. Many alumnae played on the national team. Many alumni have played for the national team.

St. Joseph's oldest cricket rival is St. Anthony's College, Kandy. They compete for the Murali-Vaas Trophy, which was inaugurated in 2007 and named after St. Anthony's alumnus Muttiah Muralitharan and St. Joseph's alumnus Chaminda Vaas. In 2012 the two schools celebrated their historic 100th encounter. The most high-profile rivalry is against St. Peter's College, a brother school founded as its satellite campus and also known as the St. Joseph's College South. The annual match-up is known locally as the "Battle of the Saints" or "Joe–Pete".

Rectors 
Rectors of the College

College anthem

The College anthem, ''Fruits Of Virtue & of Knowledge'', was composed by Edgar Neydorff. The words are by Fr. John M. Lanigan O.M.I.

Notable alumni

Facilities 
St. Joseph's College did not have a chapel when it was established in 1896. The 4th Rector of the College Rev. Fr. M. J. Le Goc understood this and took the initiative of building a magnificent, grand chapel in the best of Roman Architecture. The foundation stone for the College chapel was laid on the 19th of March 1929 by the Archbishop of Colombo Antoine Coudert O. M. I. It was renovated by Rev. Fr. Stanley Abeysekara and Rev. Fr. Sylvester Ranasinghe. Currently it's been refurbished by Rev. Fr. Ranjith Andradi. The college chapel has a length of 140 ft., a breadth of 130 ft., and a height of 90 ft. with a seating capacity for 1402 people. The chapel is the principal place of worship at the College. Holy masses are celebrated daily at the chapel for which every student can participate.

The Sports Complex, also known as the “Stanley Abeysekara Auditorium” is one of the largest structures in college. Located at the rear part of college, it is one of the 244 Sports complexes in Sri Lanka. The Sports Complex Auditorium was Built in 1996 under the Rectorship of Rev. Fr. Stanley Abeysekara, celebrating the 100th anniversary of this hallowed institution. As for its purpose, it’s used as an indoor sports arena for sports such as badminton and martial arts. The auditorium is also used to host College functions in a grand manner. The Complex was recently refurbished, replacing the Vinyl flooring, adding new carpets and new curtains on stage, etc. under the Rectorship of Rev. Fr Ranjith Andradi

SkyRim Arena is a recent addition to the school. It was proposed by Rev. Fr. Travis Gabriel, the 13th Rector of St. Joseph’s College and implemented by the sports Council led by Brian Obeysekere. On 20 June 2017, St. Joseph's College declared open the "Skyrim Arena", a new outdoor sporting arena which contains basketball courts and tennis courts. It took about a year to finish this complex. Former Josephian, minister Harin Fernando was the chief guest at the opening ceremony. This arena gives equal prominence to sports such as Basketball, Tennis and Squash.

The Bonjean Memorial Hall is a wooden floored, two-story hall that has been readily available for any school event from the early times of St.Josephs College. It was built by Rev. Fr. Charles Lytton, the second rector of our college. It was built as a glowing tribute to Rev. Fr. Bonjean, the great visionary who played a vital role as one of the founders of this great institution.The Bonjean Hall being an antiquity of the college, is also a symbol of cultural richness in the institution. During the past few years, it has been used to host various club inaugurations, prize distributions and seminars for college students. The calm surrounding and the efficient ventilation and acoustics of the Bonjean Hall makes it a nostalgic venue for any kind of event.The past administration of our college has taken various steps to uphold the glory of this prestigious landmark. Refurbishments, modern seating arrangements and technological additions are few of the present changes that doesn't go unnoticed.

The Auditorium next to Fr. Rector’s office is mainly utilized by the students of the upper school. Due to the Auditorium’s infrastructure, a large number of students can be accommodated.

The swimming pool of our college was declared open by Lord Soulbury in 1952. It was the brainchild of Rev. Fr. Peter Pillai, the 5th Rector. Spanning 50ft, it was the first Olympic Standard swimming pool in Sri Lanka. The college swimming team have won the 'Sri Lanka Schools Swimming Championship' for the past 19 years consecutively.

The Main grounds of our college is located right at the entrance. Mainly sports such as Cricket, Rugby and Athletics are practiced here. The Main ground consists of a score board which was refurbished with LED displays, and on either side of the ground there are outdoor Cricket nets.

The Beire grounds located in the rear section of college is a place where many sports practices such as Football, Rugby and Hockey are mainly conducted. The ground consists of two Football goal posts and two Rugby posts on either side of the ground. There are also a set of showers located on the side of the ground which sportsmen use to refresh themselves after sports practices.
The Premadasa pavilion, also known as the cricket pavilion, has been a primary feature of our college since the 1970s. The pavilion, which was constructed under the direction of Rev. Fr. Quintus Fernando, the 8th Rector of our college, was named the Premadasa pavilion in memory of Hon. Ranasinghe Premadasa, the first old boy prime minister, who was felicitated in 1977 by the Josephian family.

References

External links
 Official website
 Official Old Boys Union Website
 Official SJC News / SJC Sports Website

Senewiratne, A.M., Till The Mountains Disappear: The Story of St.Joseph's College, 2020, p. 246 (+XIV) *

1896 establishments in Ceylon
Catholic schools in Sri Lanka
Catholic secondary schools in Sri Lanka
Educational institutions established in 1896
Private schools in Sri Lanka
Schools in Colombo
Schools in Sri Lanka founded by missionaries